is a soccer simulation game, developed by Affect and published by Yojigen, which was released exclusively in Japan in 1994. It features teams from the Japanese high schools. These teams are located on the islands in addition to the mainland.

Two sequels were spawned: Zenkoku Kōkō Soccer 2 and Zenkoku Kōkō Soccer Senshuken '96.

References
 Zenkoku Kōkō Soccer at GameFAQs
 全国高校サッカー at superfamicom.jp
 Zenkoku Kōkō Soccer at superfamicom.org

See also
 All Japan High School Soccer Tournament

1994 video games
Affect (company) games
Yojigen games
High school association football video games
Japan-exclusive video games
Super Nintendo Entertainment System games
Super Nintendo Entertainment System-only games
Video games developed in Japan
Video games set in Japan
Multiplayer and single-player video games